Ahmet Hüsrev Altan (born 2 March 1950) is a Turkish journalist and author. A working journalist for more than twenty years, he has served in all stages of the profession, from being a night shift reporter to editor in chief in various newspapers.

Biography
He was born 1950 in Ankara, Turkey to the notable journalist and writer Çetin Altan as the first of two sons. His brother Mehmet Altan is also a journalist, writer and university professor of political economy.

Career
In addition to having written columns in several Turkish newspapers, including Hürriyet, Milliyet and Radikal, Altan has produced news programming for television.

He was fired from Milliyet after writing a column on 17 April 1995 titled "Atakürt", which presented an alternate history of Turkey as a Kurdish state ("Kürdiye") in which ethnic Turks are oppressed and forced to assimilate. For the same column he received a suspended sentence to an imprisonment  of 1 year and 8 months and fined about $12'000.  

In 2007 he became the founding editor-in-chief and lead columnist of the Taraf, a daily Turkish newspaper, and remained in the position until his resignation in December 2012.

In September 2008, when Altan published an article titled "Oh, My Brother" dedicated to the victims of the Armenian genocide he was charged under Article 301 of the Turkish Penal Code for "denigrating Turkishness". The judicial claim was initiated by the far-right "Great Union Party."

Altan, along with some of his Taraf associates, usually carried a firearm for self-protection.

As the editor of Taraf, Altan was accused of working to silence allegations of the Gülen movement cheating in compulsory public servants’ examinations in Turkey to further their power in the state.

On December 14, 2012, Ahmet Altan resigned his post as editor-in-chief of Taraf. With him stepped down his assistant editor Yasemin Çongar, and Neşe Tüzel. The next day, the three departing journalists were joined by columnist Hadi Uluengin.

Prosecution 

During Turkey's media purge after the failed July 2016 coup d'état on September 23, 2016, Altan, was arrested. He is accused of sending "subliminal messages" to encourage 2016 Turkish coup d'état attempt planners.

In September 2017, while banned from written communications, Altan produced an essay The Writer's Paradox in which he says: 'I am writing these words from a prison cell ... But wait. Before you start playing the drums of mercy for me listen to what I will tell you ... They may have the power to imprison me but no one has the power to keep me in prison. I am a writer.' The essay was published on 18 September 2017, on the eve of Altan's trial: in English by The Society of Authors (translated by Yasemin Çongar) and in the original Turkish by English PEN.

As the trial began, many authors spoke out in support of Altan. Neil Gaiman said "I hope that everyone who can read, whatever their politics, reads Ahmet Altan's response to his imprisonment. Repressive regimes hope that if they lock up writers they are also locking up ideas. This will always fail." Joanne Harris said "Writers exist to question, to challenge, sometimes even to ridicule - the status quo. For a government to imprison a writer for doing this is to attack, not only freedom of speech, but freedom of the imagination. It is a backward, oppressive and ultimately futile gesture that can only lead to greater and more damaging social unrest."

On 16 February 2018, Ahmet, along with his brother Mehmet Altan, was sentenced to life imprisonment. From prison, he wrote notes he gave to his lawyers, and published his memoirs under the title I Will Never See the World Again, translated into English by Yasemin Çongar. The book was longlisted for the 2019 Baillie Gifford Prize for non-fiction  and is published in 17 countries around the world. But it is not published in Turkish as Altan has concern about the safety of the publisher.

On 4 November 2019 Altan was sentenced to 10 years and 6 months imprisonment by the court of cassation, but then the court ordered his release on probation. On 12 November 2019 the police detained him again after a ruling reversing his release.

On the 25 of November 2019, Altan was awarded the Geschwister Scholl Prize, a literary award of the Bavarian branch of the German Publishers and Booksellers Association.

Altan was released from prison on 14 April 2021 after order by the Court of Cassation.

Awards 

 1983, Akademi Bookstore Literature Awards, First Prize in the category of “Novel”
 1998, Yunus Nadi Literature Prize in the category of ‘’Novel’’
 2011, International Hrant Dink Award
 2013, Turkish Publishers Association, Freedom of Thought and Expression Prize
 2017, Istanbul Human Rights Association Ayşe Nur Zarakolu Freedom of Thought and Expression Prize
 2019, Geschwister Scholl Preis

Bibliography

Memoirs 

 I will never see the world again, (Other Press, 2019), translated by Yasemin Çongar

Novels
 Kılıç Yarası Gibi (1997, Can Yayınları), the first novel in the Ottoman Quartet. Published in English in a translation by Brendan Freely and  Yelda Türedi as Like a Sword Wound (2018, Europa Editions)
 Dört Mevsim Sonbahar (Four Seasons of Autumn)
 Yalnızlığın Özel Tarihi (A Private History of Loneliness)
 Sudaki İz (Trace on the Water)
 Aldatmak (Cheating)
 İsyan Günlerinde Aşk (1998, Can Yayınları), the second novel in the Ottoman Quartet. 
 Love in the Days of Rebellion, translation by Brendan Freely and  Yelda Türedi  (2020, Europa Editions) 
 En Uzun Gece (The Longest Night)
 Tehlikeli Masallar (Dangerous Tales)
 Son Oyun (2013, Everest publications), translated into English by Alexander Dawe and published as Endgame in 2016
 Ölmek Kolaydır Sevmekten (2015, Everest Yayinlari), the third novel in the Ottoman Quartet.

Collections of essays
  Gece Yarısı Şarkıları (Midnight Songs)
  İçimizde Bir Yer (Somewhere Inside Us)
  Karanlıkta Sabah Kuşları (Morning Birds in Darkness)
  Kristal Denizaltı (Crystal Submarine)
  Ve Kırar Göğsüne Bastırırken (And He Breaks While Holding Down To His Chest)

References

External links
Ahmet Altan'ın Eserlerinden örnekler, denemeleri, günlük fıkraları
Ahmet ALTAN Hakkında yazılan Polis Akademisi Bitirme Tezi
Gazetem Net'teki köşe yazıları
 Hürriyet Gazetesindeki Köşe Yazıları
 Biography of Ahmet Altan 

Turkish novelists
1950 births
Living people
Turkish former Muslims
Turkish atheists
Turkish journalists
Turkish columnists
People from Ankara
Hürriyet people
Milliyet people
Taraf people
Robert College alumni
Middle East Technical University alumni
Istanbul University alumni
Vefa High School alumni
Turkish people of Crimean Tatar descent
Prix Femina Étranger winners